Romanian singer Alexandra Stan has released five studio albums, a reissue album, two extended plays, one compilation album, two video albums, two remix albums, 47 singles (including 15 as a featured artist) and 11 promotional singles. Stan's career began in 2009, when music producers Marcel Prodan and Andrei Nemirschi heard her singing at a karaoke bar and signed her to their label, Maan Studio. That same year, she released the promotional song "Show Me the Way". Her debut single, "Lollipop (Param Pam Pam)" (2009), reached number 58 in Romania.

In 2010, the singer released her breakthrough single "Mr. Saxobeat", which was an immediate commercial success, peaking at number one on the Romanian Top 100 for eight consecutive weeks. The single was subsequently released internationally, reaching the top position in several countries across Europe including Germany and Italy. The recording was certified in multiple regions, including Platinum in the United Kingdom and the United States, triple Gold in Germany and Gold in Spain. Stan's follow-up "Get Back (ASAP)" charted in a number of European countries, also peaking at number 56 on the UK Singles Chart. In August 2011, Stan's debut album, Saxobeats, was made available and managed to reach the top 40 in Austria, Finland, Germany, Hungary, Japan and Switzerland.

In 2013, Saxobeats was re-released under the title Cliché (Hush Hush) exclusively in Japan. The reissue spawned three singles: "Lemonade", "Cliché (Hush Hush)" and "All My People". Stan's second studio album, Unlocked, was issued in August 2014 and yielded the singles "Cherry Pop" and "Dance"; both gained popularity in Japan. Unlocked was less commercially successful than Saxobeats, peaking at number 21 on the Japanese Albums Chart. In June 2015, Stan debuted a single with Inna and Daddy Yankee titled "We Wanna" for her third studio album Alesta (2016), reaching modest peaks in several countries. "I Did It, Mama!"—from the same record—peaked at number nine on the local Airplay 100 chart. She was also part of the supergroup G Girls on "Call the Police". Prior to releasing her fourth studio album Mami in April 2018, Stan collaborated with Manuel Riva on "Miami", reaching the top ten in Romania and on the US Dance Club Songs chart. Her 2020 single "Obsesii" reached number 12 on the Airplay 100.

Albums

Studio albums

Reissued albums

Remix albums

Compilation albums

Extended plays

Singles

As lead artist

As featured artist

Promotional singles

Other singles

Videography

Video albums

Music videos

Notes

References

External links

[ Alexandra Stan] discography at Allmusic

Alexandra Stan
Stan, Alexandra